The 2018 United Bowl was the championship game of the 2018 Indoor Football League season. It was played between the Sioux Falls Storm and the Iowa Barnstormers. The game was played at Wells Fargo Arena in Des Moines, Iowa.

This was the Sioux Falls Storm's ninth consecutive United Bowl appearance; prior to the game, they held a United Bowl record of 6–2. This was the Iowa Barnstormers' first United Bowl appearance after joining the IFL in 2015 from the Arena Football League.

Venue
The game was played at Wells Fargo Arena in Des Moines, Iowa, as the Iowa Barnstormers had the home field advantage by cause of being the higher seeded team in the playoffs.

Background

Sioux Falls Storm

The Storm began the season with a 39–33 loss to the Arizona Rattlers before embarking on a four-game win streak, including a 52–40 victory over the Barnstormers on March 18. After another loss to the Rattlers on April 16, the Storm won seven of their final eight games, finishing the season with a record of 11–3, earning third place. On June 23, the Storm defeated the Rattlers in the first round of the playoffs in overtime by a score of 69–68, earning their place in the United Bowl for the ninth consecutive year.

Iowa Barnstormers

The Barnstormers opened the 2018 season on February 25 with a 41–20 victory over the Green Bay Blizzard. After losing two of their next four games, including a 52–40 loss to the Storm on March 18, the Barnstormers won eight of their final nine, with their only loss being against the Storm by a score of 51–49. The Barnstormers finished the season with a record of 11–3, earning first place and home field advantage in the playoffs. In the first round, the Barnstormers defeated the Nebraska Danger 42–17 to reach the 2018 United Bowl.

Box score

References

United Bowl
Sports competitions in Iowa
United Bowl
Sioux Falls Storm
Iowa Barnstormers
United Bowl
United Bowl